The Palm Beach County Open was a golf tournament on the LPGA Tour, played only in 1968.  It was played at the Cypress Creek Country Club in Boynton Beach, Florida. Mickey Wright won the event by four  strokes over Ruth Jessen and Carol Mann.

References

Former LPGA Tour events
Golf in Florida
Sports in Palm Beach County, Florida
Boynton Beach, Florida
Women's sports in Florida